The Wright-Brooks House, also known as the Daniel Pratt House, is a single-family home located at 122 North High Street in Marshall, Michigan. It was listed on the National Register of Historic Places in 1972.

History
In 1840, Daniel and Eunice Pratt moved to Marshall, where Daniel established himself as a jeweler. He likely began construction on this house in 1841, finishing it in time for his daughter's wedding in 1842 to George S. Wright, a businessman and banker who had arrived in Marshall in 1835. In 1849, the Pratts moved on to Niles, Michigan, where Daniel died ten years later. When they left Marshall, they left the house to their daughter and son-in-law, the Wrights.

George Wright continued to work at a bank until his retirement. Afterward, he moved away from Marshall, leaving the house to his son. George Wright died in 1893. The house remained in the Wright family until 1934, when it was purchased by preservationist Harold C. Brooks. Brooks rehabilitated the house for his son Craig, who lived in the house at least into the 1970s.

Description
The Wright~Brooks House is a single-story brick Greek Revival house with a gable roof. It sits on a sandstone foundation, and a clapboard addition is constructed at the rear. The house has a notable front entrance portico, supported by four delicate Doric columns and containing an elaborate entrance with  architrave trim, sidelights, and a transom. The entrance is flanked by high porch windows, which extend almost to the floor.

References

		
National Register of Historic Places in Calhoun County, Michigan
Greek Revival houses in Michigan
Houses completed in 1841
1841 establishments in Michigan
National Historic Landmark District contributing properties
Individually listed contributing properties to historic districts on the National Register in Michigan
Houses on the National Register of Historic Places in Michigan